Hugh Lamprey (2 August 1928 - 10 February 1996) was a British ecologist and bush pilot. After travelling on student expeditions to Iceland, the Himalayas, and the Canary Islands, he served in Palestine and Egypt as a tank officer. Subsequently he obtained a position in Tanganyika, and in the Game Department in 1953, he designed methods of estimating game densities that are still widely used. He applied these to studies of food sources of Tsetse flies (specifically Glossina swynnertoni) in Kenya.

This statement has been instrumental to the belief that desertification is a great threat to the world and especially Africa.

References

Information about Northern Tanzania, biography
Fred Pearce, New Scientist vol 175 issue 2351 - 13 July 2002, page 50.

1928 births
1996 deaths
20th-century British biologists
British ecologists
Bush pilots